Adelaide Anne Gay (born November 3, 1989) is an American soccer goalkeeper currently playing for Fortuna Hjørring in the Elitedivisionen. She previously played for Nordsjælland and Kvarnsvedens IK, Íþróttabandalag Vestmannaeyja (IBV) in Iceland and several  different teams in NWSL.

Early life
Born in Princeton, New Jersey to Lori and John Gay, Adelaide attended and played for the Lawrenceville School in Lawrenceville, New Jersey. Gay was goalkeeper on the varsity soccer team and was captain of the team as a senior in 2007. She helped lead her team to three Prep A finals—in 2004, 2006 and 2007—was named first-team All-MAPLS her sophomore through senior years, was a NJISAA Prep A first-team choice those same three years, and was The Trentonian prep A player of the year selection in 2007. Gay also excelled academically. She graduated with a 4.0 GPA, member of Cum Laude Society, and was a National Merit Scholar. Gay also competed in indoor track running the 200 and 800 meters and throwing shot put.

Gay also played for the PDA Power club team which won State Cup championships four times as well as the 2005 regional title. The club team was a national finalist in 2005. Gay was captain of the team that won the Region 1 Premier League championship in 2004 & 2006 and was a finalist in 2005 and 2007. She was also chosen as a member of the Region 1 Olympic Development Program (ODP) Team.

College
Gay attended Yale University in 2009. The following year, she transferred to the University of North Carolina where she stayed for the remainder of her collegiate career and majored in Business Administration.

During her sophomore year in 2010, Gay played in six games and logged a 0.94 goals against average (GAA).  Her junior year, Gay played 900 minutes, alternating halves with Anna Sieloff in goal. She allowed only four goals and led the Atlantic Coast Conference (ACC) in goals against average at 0.40. Gay recorded a save percentage of .852 with 23 saves on the season, including a career high of four against Texas A&M.  She was named a first-team Capital One Academic All-America by College Sports Information Directors of America and earned Academic All-District honors. She was an All-ACC Academic Team selection and was nominated for the 2012 ACC Academic Honor Roll. Gay finished with a goalkeeper record of 7–0–0 sharing shutouts with Anna Sieloff against University of North Carolina at Greensboro, Florida State, Clemson, Duke, Wake Forest, Boston College and Baylor. She recorded a scoreless streak of over 450 minutes starting in September through November.

During her senior year with the Tar Heels, Gay helped the team win their 21st NCAA championship title.

Playing career

Pali Blues, 2009
In 2009, Gay played for the Pali Blues in the W-League and helped the team win the 2009 W-League Championship.

Portland Thorns FC and Washington Spirit, 2013–14
In 2013, the Portland Thorns FC signed Gay as a discovery player headed into the inaugural season of the National Women's Soccer League (NWSL). When Portland signed Amber Brooks on January 2, 2014, they waived Gay ahead of the 2014 season. She signed with the Washington Spirit in April of the same year.

Kvarnsveden, 2015–16
In 2015, Gay signed with Kvarnsvedens IK in the Swedish Elitettan.
Gay played every minute of the team's 26 league games and recorded 16 clean sheets helping the team win the league title and promotion to the top-division Damallsvenskan.
Gay re-signed for the 2016 season with Kvarnsveden in the Damallsvenskan.

Íþróttabandalag Vestmannaeyja (IBV), 2017
Gay signed with Icelandic club Íþróttabandalag Vestmannaeyja (IBV) for the 2017 season and helped the team win the 2017 Icelandic Women's Cup in September.

Seattle Reign FC, 2018
In March 2018, Gay signed with Seattle Reign FC in the NWSL as a national team replacement player.

Portland Thorns FC, 2018
In April 2018, Gay signed with the Portland Thorns again as a national team replacement player.

Kvarnsveden, 2018
After being released from Portland she got a call from Sweden and in July again signed with Kvarnsvedens IK now back in the Swedish Elitettan for the second half of the season.

References

External links
 
 Portland Thorns FC player profile
 Yale University player profile
 University of North Carolina player profile
 
 

1989 births
Living people
American women's soccer players
Lawrenceville School alumni
North Carolina Tar Heels women's soccer players
Pali Blues players
People from Princeton, New Jersey
Portland Thorns FC players
Soccer players from New Jersey
Sportspeople from Mercer County, New Jersey
USL W-League (1995–2015) players
UNC Kenan–Flagler Business School alumni
Women's association football goalkeepers
Yale Bulldogs women's soccer players
Kvarnsvedens IK players
Damallsvenskan players
Adelaide Gay
21st-century American women